Fantastics from Exile Tribe (Japanese: ファンタスティックス・フロム・エグザイル・トライブ, stylized as FANTASTICS from EXILE TRIBE and formerly known as Fantastics) is a nine-member Japanese male dance and vocal group formed and managed by LDH. The group is part of the collective Exile Tribe, related to Exile, and signed to the record label Rhythm Zone from the Avex Group. Fantastics debuted on December 5, 2018.

History

2016: Formation 
On December 29, Sekai, Sato Taiki and five performers from EXPG were selected to form a new dance group.

2017: Pre-debut 
On January 31, the group's name and formation was announced in TBS TV show  consisting of 5 performers coming from EXPG and 2 Exile members Sekai and Taiki being the leaders of the unit. The 5 new performers also originated from the dance team Exile Generations and included: Natsuki Sawamoto, Leiya Seguchi, Natsuki Hori, Keito Kimura and Shota Nakao.

From February 13 until April 16 the group started their Musha shugyō. On December 20, Yusei Yagi and Sota Nakajima were announced as the two finalist who passed the audition on NTV's "Sukkiri".

2018: Fantastic 9 
On March 3, Shota Nakao announced that he would be suspending his activities due to stomach cancer to receive treatment. From April 14 to June 10, the group launched their second Musha shugyō, entitled "Yume-sha shugyō FANTASTIC 9". On May 1, it was announced that Ballistik Boyz would be the opening act of the events starting from May 12.

On May 4, the group featured on Exile's digital single "Turn Back Time," which was dedicated to Shota and the group's first release. The music video for this song included hand-written messages and get-well wishes from every Exile Tribe artist for Shota.

On July 8, it was announced that Shota had died of gastric cancer on July 6.

On July 14, at Dance Earth Festival 2018, which was the group's first stage since Shota's death announcement, the members announced that "FANTASTICS is 9 people.". Shortly after, LDH announced a memorial event dedicated to Shota for fans. The event was held on August 25 and 26, with fans bringing letters, pictures and art to share the memories they have of him.

On September 15, during Exile's concert Exile Live Tour 2018-2019 "Star of Wish", they were announced as an official EXILE TRIBE group with the announcement of their major debut on December 5 with the single "Over Drive".

2019: Singles, Battle of Tokyo and first tour 
On April 3, the group released their 2nd single "Flying Fish". After finishing promotions for their second release, LDH's multimedia project "Battle of Tokyo", which includes all Jr.Exile groups, started in June. During this month those 4 groups released collaboration singles every week, until they released a full album titled "Battle Of Tokyo 〜Enter The Jr.Exile〜" on July 3, 2019. Accompanying the album release, the groups held a row of live performances from July 4 to 7 with the same name. Since those dates included the first anniversary of Shota's death, a memorial for him was built at the concert venue. On July 6, the groups also performed "Turn Back Time" together in honor of Shota.

On August 9, the group announced they will hold their first national hall tour combining "Sound" and "Drama" titled "Fantastics Sound Drama 2019 Fantastic Nine" beginning on October 11 and ending on November 21.

On August 21, the group released their 3rd single "Dear Destiny", which is their first ballad as a title track.

On October 9, it was announced that they would release their 4th single "Time Camera" on December 4. The title track will be an upbeat song in contrast to their previous single.

On November 21, the last day of their first tour, it was announced that Fantastics would release their first full album titled FANTASTIC 9 on February 12, 2020, and their first photobook (focusing on the photos of their 1st hall tour) in spring of 2020. Additionally, it was revealed that the group would go on their second tour and first arena tour titled Fantastics LiveTour 2020 "FNT" in 2020 too. The tour would be part of LDH Perfect Year 2020: Season 2 "Imagination".

On December 8, it was revealed that Fantastics and The Rampage would be in charge of the special movie theme songs for the 40th anniversary project of Mobile Suit Gundam titled Gundam × Ken Okuyama Design × LDH Japan “G40 Project”. Fantastics' theme song "To The Sky" and The Rampage's theme song "Show You The Way" would both reflect the story of Mobile Suit Gundam from two different aspects. The full special movie project was released on Gundam's official YouTube channel on January 1, 2020.

2020: First studio album FANTASTIC 9 and Live×Online 
Shortly after the release of their first full album FANTASTIC 9 on February 12, 2020, it was announced that the group would release their 5th single "Hey,darlin’" on April 1.

On April 15, the group released their first group photobook Fantastics Nine which includes photos from their first tour Fantastics Sound Drama 2019 Fantastic Nine.

Fantastics's second tour Fantastics Live Tour 2020 "FNT" was scheduled from March 28 to July 19, but due to COVID-19 pandemic, all performances were cancelled. In compensation, Fantastics held a series of livestreamed concerts on the Japanese streaming platform AbemaTV from July to December. Live×Online "Fantastics" was held on July 2. Live×Online Imagination "Fantastics" was held on September 24. On October 30, they participated on Live×Online Infinity "Trick or Treat!! R.F.B. Halloween Party!!", and finally Live×Online Beyond The Border Toshi Wasure Night Fever on December 26.

On July 25, Fantastics announced their 6th single "Winding Road -mirai e-" to be released on September 23. Not long after the release, the group announced their upcoming 7th single titled "High Fever" which would serve as the theme song of the group's first leading TV drama "Mannequin Night Fever", the single was released on November 11.

On December 31, the group took part in the livestreamed concert of LDH artists, Live×Online Countdown 2020▶2021"Rising Sun to the World".

2021: Fantastic Voyage 
From March 10 to June 28, the group took part in the dome tour of Exile Tribe: EXILE TRIBE LIVE TOUR 2021 "RISING SUN TO THE WORLD". The tour was LDH's first live tour with presential audience since the cancellation of all concerts in February 2020 due to the COVID-19 pandemic.

The second live tour FANTASTICS PROLOGUE LIVE TOUR 2021 "FANTASTIC VOYAGE" ~WAY TO THE GLORY~ took place from March 19 to June 21, 2021.

On March 17, the group released the song "Play Back" digitally which served as theme song for the group's TV show FUN! FUN! FANTASTICS. From April 10 to May 5, all members except for Sekai and Sato Taiki held the live stage BACK TO THE MEMORIES which is linked to their previous TV show, for this occasion they formed the special unit Fantastic6.

On April 18, a new album by Jr.Exile for the Battle of Tokyo project titled "Battle of Tokyo Time 4 Jr.Exile" was announced to be released on June 23, the songs by the individual groups and the collaboration song of Generations & The Rampage were pre-released digitally from April 19 to June 21, the music videos were released in a hybrid live-action/animated form, with this latter featuring the four groups' avatars. Moreover, the DVD Version included the concert video of "Battle Of Tokyo ~Enter The Jr.Exile~" held in Makuhari Messe in July 2019.

On May 19, the group released their 8th single "Stop For Nothing".

On August 18, the group released their second album "Fantastic Voyage" which includes all their songs starting from 2020 plus three songs which were pre-released digitally ahead of the album's release: "DiVE" on July 5, "Summer drops" on July 12, and the album's promotional track "Drive Me Crazy" on July 26 in which Alan Shirahama collaborated in its production.

The third live tour FANTASTICS LIVE TOUR 2021 "FANTASTIC VOYAGE" ~WAY TO THE GLORY~ is a continuation of the previous tour, scheduled from October 28 to February 13, 2022. It was extended to February 22, 2022 with the announcement of 8 additional concerts on November 8, 2021 and 2 additional final concerts at Tokyo Garden Theater being named FANTASTICS LIVE TOUR 2021 "FANTASTIC VOYAGE" ~WAY TO THE GLORY~ THE FINAL on January 17, 2022.

On December 15, the group released the tribute single "Fantastics from Exile" as a part of Exile's 20th anniversary celebration project "Exile Tribute", the single is the third of the four consecutive tribute singles releases by Jr.Exile groups.

2022 : Santa Monica Lollipop 
On March 9, Fantastics released their 9th single and first of the year titled "Santa Monica Lollipop", the title song was used as the theme for the 2nd season of the group's variety show "Fun! Fun! Fantastics". In addition, the B-side songs include "Tie and Tie" which is the ending song of the anime "Rusted Armors -Dawn-" and "Turn to You" which is  the ending song for the drama "Liar" starring fellow member Taiki Sato.

From April 1 to May 1, "Fantastic6" performed in the live stage Back To The Memories Part 2. 

The new crown program “Furusato Fanta” is the first jointly funded format program by Fuji TV and FNS in the history of Fuji TV, which is broadcast from April 1. A Fake Documentary "The Usual Night" is aired on ABC TV from May 2.

On May 25, the group released the live album Fantastics Live Tour 2021 "Fantastic Voyage" ~Way To The Glory~ Live CD. 

Fantastics Live Tour 2022 "Fan Fan Hop" to be held from June 8 to August 7.

On June 29, they released their 10th single "Escape", the title song is the ending theme song of TV Tokyo's drama “Hanayome Miman Escape”.

Members

Present members

Honorary member

Discography

Studio albums

Singles

Participating works

Tie-up

Live

As a lead artists

As a participating group

As a support act

Filmography

TV shows

Dramas

Radio

Music videos

Awards

Notes

References

External links 
 FANTASTICS from EXILE TRIBE Official Website
 FANTASTICS from EXILE TRIBE Official Profile
 FANTASTICS from EXILE TRIBE (@fantastics_fext) on Twitter

2018 establishments in Japan
Avex Group artists
Japanese boy bands
Japanese dance music groups
Japanese musical groups
Japanese pop music groups
Musical groups established in 2018
LDH (company) artists